Asier Fernández de Bobadilla Rola (born 22 June 1972) is a Spanish windsurfer. He competed in the men's Lechner A-390 event at the 1992 Summer Olympics.

References

External links
 
 

1972 births
Living people
Spanish windsurfers
Spanish male sailors (sport)
Olympic sailors of Spain
Sailors at the 1992 Summer Olympics – Lechner A-390
Sportspeople from Bilbao
Sailors (sport) from the Basque Country (autonomous community)